Jackson Heights is an unincorporated community and census-designated place (CDP) in Lenoir County, North Carolina, United States. Its population was 1,141 as of the 2010 census.

Geography
North Carolina Highway 11 and North Carolina Highway 55 form the northwestern border of the community. The highways run northeastward together into Kinston, while NC 11 leads southwest  to Kenansville and NH 55 leads west  to Mount Olive. U.S. Route 258 passes just southeast of Jackson Heights, leading northeast into Kinston and south  to Jacksonville.

Demographics

References

Unincorporated communities in Lenoir County, North Carolina
Unincorporated communities in North Carolina
Census-designated places in Lenoir County, North Carolina
Census-designated places in North Carolina